Winter wheat (usually Triticum aestivum) are strains of wheat that are planted in the autumn to germinate and develop into young plants that remain in the vegetative phase during the winter and resume growth in early spring. Classification into spring wheat versus winter wheat is common and traditionally refers to the season during which the crop is grown. For winter wheat, the physiological stage of heading (when the ear first emerges) is delayed until the plant experiences vernalization, a period of 30 to 60 days of cold winter temperatures (0° to 5 °C; 32–41 °F). 

Winter wheat is usually planted from September to November (in the Northern Hemisphere) and harvested in the summer or early autumn of the next year. In some places (e.g. Chile) a winter-wheat crop fully 'completes' in a year's time before harvest. Winter wheat usually yields more than spring wheat. 

So-called "facultative" wheat varieties need shorter periods of vernalization time (15–30 days) and temperatures of 3° to 15 °C (37–59 °F). In many areas facultative varieties can be grown either as winter or as a spring, depending on time of sowing.

In countries that experience mild winters, such as in South Asia (India, Pakistan, Nepal, Bangladesh), North Africa, the Middle East and the lower latitudes (e.g. Sonora in Mexico), spring wheat (not requiring a period of vernalization) is also sown in the autumn (November–December) and harvested in late spring (April–May) the next year. This spring wheat planted in the autumn and grown over the winter is sometimes also incorrectly called "winter wheat".

Hard winter wheats have a higher gluten protein content than other wheats. They are used to make flour for yeast breads, or are blended with soft spring wheats to make the all-purpose flour used in a wide variety of baked products. Pure soft wheat is used for specialty or cake flour. Durum, the hardest wheat, is primarily used for making pasta. Almost all durum wheat grown in North America is spring-planted.

Winter wheat is grown throughout Europe and North America, and in Siberia.

Cultivation 
Winter wheat is grown as a cash crop or a cover crop. Optimal growing conditions for winter wheat include high-drainage soil with medium texture. Mid-quality soil nutrient content is best for winter wheat, with an appropriate supply of nitrogen being critical for the wheat to be able to establish itself in time before winter dormancy. In addition, a firm seedbed helps protect the wheat over the winter period.

Benefits of growing winter wheat 

 If used as cover crop, winter wheat prevents soil erosion over winter when many fields lie fallow, and helps maintain topsoil
 Winter wheat out-competes many weed varieties
 Can be grown as both cover crop and cash crop
 Easy to manage while still providing good yield
 Helps build soil (through heavy production of organic material) and cycle nutrients through soil
 Uses soil moisture more efficiently since it starts to grow earlier in the spring
 Crop is harvested earlier in the season, which is beneficial in regions with rainy autumn weather

United States
Winter wheat was brought to Kansas by German-Russian Mennonites in the 19th century. Bernhard Warkentin and Mark A. Carleton played a major part in the spread of winter wheat as a commercial crop. Warkentin organized mills in central Kansas and imported seed from Ukraine to meet growing demand. Carleton worked for the United States Department of Agriculture (USDA) as a crop explorer. He went to Russia to find other wheat varieties and worked with Kansas State University researchers to develop new ones. Winter wheat production quickly spread throughout the Great Plains, and was, as it still is, usually grown using the techniques of dryland farming.

Effects of climate change 

For temperate climate zones, increases in yields for winter wheat due to climate change are predicted for example in the case of spring wheat in Canada. For Ukraine where temperatures are increasing throughout the year and precipitation is predicted to increase, winter wheat yields could increase by 20-40% in the north and northwestern regions by 2050, as compared to 2010.

References

Wheat
German-Russian culture in the United States

de:Weizen#Anbau